Torrian Gray (born March 18, 1974) is an American football coach and former player who is currently the defensive backs coach at the University of South Carolina. Also known by the nickname “Big Play Torrian Gray”.

College career
Gray was three times an all-Big East selection for the Virginia Tech Hokies.  His college teams won two Big East championships and in 1995, upset the Texas Longhorns in the 1995 Sugar Bowl.

Professional career
Following his playing career at Tech, Gray was drafted by the Minnesota Vikings 49th overall in the second round of the 1997 NFL Draft. He played two seasons with the Minnesota Vikings backing up Orlando Thomas at free safety. He started five games as a rookie, including two playoff contests. He contributed as a starter in the nickel package and as a special teams player before retiring in the spring of 2000 due to a knee injury. The Vikings advanced to the playoffs in each of his three seasons.

Coaching career
Gray returned to Virginia Tech to coach defensive backs following the departure of Lorenzo Ward to the Oakland Raiders. Gray coached several players who played in the NFL including: Aaron Rouse, Brandon Flowers, Macho Harris, Kam Chancellor, Roc Carmichael, Jayron Hosley, Kyle Fuller, Antone Exum, Kyshoen Jarrett, Kendall Fuller, Chuck Clark, Terrell Edmunds, Greg Stroman, and Brandon Facyson.

On February 4, 2017, Gray was named Defensive Backs coach of the NFL's Washington Redskins.

On January 21, 2019, Gray chose to join the University of Florida football team as the Defensive Backs coach.

References

1974 births
Living people
Chicago Bears coaches
Florida Gators football coaches
Maine Black Bears football coaches
Minnesota Vikings players
South Carolina Gamecocks football coaches
UConn Huskies football coaches
Virginia Tech Hokies football players
Virginia Tech Hokies football coaches
Washington Redskins coaches
Sportspeople from Lakeland, Florida
Coaches of American football from Florida
Players of American football from Florida